Captain Holojoy's Space Diner is a Man or Astro-man? 7-inch EP released on Lucky Records in 1993. It was released on opaque pink vinyl and black vinyl.  It came with two inserts: a postcard showing the Astromen eating in a diner, and a larger card stock insert with a photo of a band member on one side and fictitious song lyrics on the other.

Track listing

In-Between Meals Side
"The Universe's Only Intergalactic Radioactive Breakfast Bar"
"Taco Wagon" (Dick Dale)
"Holojoy's Interlude"

TV Dinner Side
"Mystery Meat"
"Space Potatoes" (Rozier)
"You Can't Get Good Riblets in Space"

Line Up
Star Crunch - Freeze Dried Guitar Pickin'
Birdstuff - Interstellar Moon Drums with Fruit Roll Up Heads Played on with Lik-a-Sticks
Dr. Deleto and His Invisible Vaportron - Microwavable Radiacto Bass
Coco the Electronic Monkey Wizard - Mammoth Venusion Space Bananas

References

Man or Astro-man? EPs
1993 EPs